A defence district (Fo) was a military subdivision of the Swedish Armed Forces created in 1914. It was a lower regional level subdivision, usually corresponding to a Swedish county. The commander of a defence district was the Defence District Commander, who usually commanded local defence units, including infantry, engineers, air defence and light artillery, as well as any Home Guard units in the district. The commander answered to the larger military district that the defence district was part of.

History
A defence district was the lowest regional unit in the Swedish Armed Forces. Such were found in particularly important coastal areas during World War I and from 1939 on at a time of mobilization. From 1943 they were included as part of the ordinary peace organization. The district was responsible for defence planning, home defence, supervision of fixed facilities, certain territorial units and the Home Guard equipment and equipment. In 1973-76, the defence districts were amalgamated with regiments into defence district regiments (försvarsområdesregementen) (except Fo 67, which remained independent), but in the early 1990s some independent defence districts again were formed. These latter districts were disbanded as a result of the Defence Act of 1996. The locations of the defence districts are often indicated by their names. A defence district has usually been matched by a Swedish county except in Norrbotten where there were three defence districts.

List

1914–1918
Gävleborg Defence District
Northern Uppland Defence District (Norra Upplands försvarsområde)
Norrbotten Defence District
Norrköping Defence District

1939–1942
Ystad Defence District
Malmö Defence District
Kristianstad Defence District 
Helsingborg Defence District
Hässleholm Defence District (1939–1942), amalgamated into Kristianstad Defence District
Karlshamn Defence District
Kronoberg Defence District (1939–1940), succeeded by Älmhult Defence District
Älmhult Defence District (1940–1942), succeeded by Växjö Defence District
Eksjö Defence District (1939–1940), succeeded by Nässjö Defence District
Nässjö Defence District (1940–1942), succeeded by Jönköping Defence District
Jönköping Defence District (1942–)
Kalmar Defence District
Gävle Defence District
Härnösand Defence District
Västernorrland Defence District (1939–1940), succeeded by Sollefteå Defence District
Sollefteå Defence District (1940–1942), amalgamated into Härnösand Defence District
Sundsvall Defence District (1940–1942), amalgamated into Härnösand Defence District
Örnsköldsvik Defence District (1940–1942), amalgamated into Härnösand Defence District
Östersund Defence District
Borås Defence District (1939–1942), split between Uddevalla and Gothenburg Defence Districts
Gothenburg Defence District
Halmstad Defence District
Skövde Defence District
Uddevalla Defence District
Vänersborg Defence District (1939–1942), amalgamated into Uddevalla Defence District
Linköping Defence District
Northern Mälardalen Defence District (Mälardalens norra försvarsområde) (1939–1940), succeeded by Sala Defence District
Sala Defence District (1940–1942), amalgamated into Uppsala Defence District
Southern Mälardalen Defence District (Mälardalens södra försvarsområde) (1939–1940), succeeded by Nyköping Defence District
Nyköping Defence District (1940–1942), succeeded by Strängnäs Defence District
Northern Uppland Defence District (Norra Upplands försvarsområde) (1939–1940), succeeded by Norrtälje Defence District
Norrtälje Defence District (1940–)
Norrköping Defence District
Stockholm Defence District
Stockholm Archipelago Defence District (Stockholms skärgårds försvarsområde)
Södertörn Defence District (1939–1940), amalgamated into Stockholm Archipelago Defence District (Stockholms skärgårds försvarsområde)
Östhammar Defence District, amalgamated in 1943 into Norrtälje Defence District
Karlstad Defence District
Örebro Defence District
Västerbotten Defence District (1939–1940), split into Vännäs and Skellefteå Defence Districts
Northern Lappland Defence District (Lapplands norra försvarsområde) (1939–1940), succeeded by Gällivare Defence District
Gällivare Defence District (1940–)
Lappland Southern Defence District (Lapplands södra försvarsområde) (1939–1940), succeeded by Storuman Defence District
Storuman Defence District (1940), amalgamated with Skellefteå and Vännäs Defence Districts into Storumans‑Vännäs‑Skellefteå Defence District
Skellefteå Defence District (1940), see Storuman Defence District above
Vännäs Defence District (1940), see Storuman Defence District above
Storuman‑Vännäs‑Skellefteå Defence District (1940–1941), then again split into three parts
Skellefteå Defence District (1941–1942), then amalgamated with Vännäs Defence District into Umeå Defence District
Storuman Defence District (1941–)
Vännäs Defence District (1941–1942), then amalgamated with Skellefteå Defence District into Umeå Defence District
Luleå Defence District (1940–)
Jokkmokk Defence District (1940–)

1943–
The 1942 organization, which came into force in 1943:

Fo 11: Malmö Defence District
Fo 12: Ystad Defence District
Fo 13: Helsingborg Defence District
Fo 14: Kristianstad Defence District
Fo 15: Blekinge Defence District (naval defence district)
Fo 16: Växjö Defence District
Fo 17: Jönköping Defence District
Fo 18: Kalmar Defence District
Fo 21: Gävle Defence District
Fo 22: Östersund Defence District
Fo 23: Härnösand Defence District
Fo 24: Hemsö Defence District (naval defence district)
Fo 31: Halmstad Defence District
Fo 32: Gothenburg Defence District
Fo 33: Gothenburg Archipelago Defence District (Göteborgs skärgårds försvarsområde) (naval defence district)
Fo 34: Uddevalla Defence District
Fo 35: Skövde Defence District
Fo 41: Linköping Defence District
Fo 42: Norrtälje Defence District
Fo 43: Strängnäs Defence District
Fo 44: Stockholm Defence District
Fo 45: Norrtälje Defence District
Fo 46: Stockholm Archipelago Defence District (Stockholms skärgårds försvarsområde) (naval defence district)
Fo 47: Uppsala Defence District
Fo 51: Örebro Defence District
Fo 52: Karlstad Defence District
Fo 53: Falu Defence District
Fo 54: Mora Defence District
Fo 61: Umeå Defence District
Fo 62: Storuman Defence District
Fo 63: Boden Defence District
Fo 64: Luleå Defence District
Fo 65: Jokkmokk Defence District
Fo 66: Kiruna Defence District
Fo 67: Morjärv Defence District

1973/76–
Since a number of reorganizations took place after 1945, the situation is reported here when the new organization with the defence district regiments (försvarsområdesregementen) has been implemented. The brackets indicate to which regiment the defence district was linked. Situation after 1973-76's creation of the defence district regiments:

Fo 11: Malmö Defence District (P 7)
Fo 14: Kristianstad Defence District (P 6)
Fo 15: Karlskrona Defence District (BK)
Fo 16: Kronoberg Defence District (I 11)
Fo 17: Jönköping Defence District (I 12)
Fo 18: Kalmar Defence District (I 11)
Fo 21: Gävleborg Defence District (I 14), designated as Fo 49 from 1966 to 1982
Fo 22: Jämtland Defence District (I 5)
Fo 23: Västernorrland Defence District (I 21)
Fo 31: Halland Defence District (I 16)
Fo 32: Gothenburg and Bohus Defence District (MKV)
Fo 34: Älvsborg Defence District (I 15)
Fo 35: Skaraborg Defence District (P 4)
Fo 41: Östergötland Defence District (I 4)
Fo 43: Södermanland Defence District (P 10)
Fo 44: Stockholm Defence District (K 1)
Fo 47: Uppsala Defence District (S 1)
Fo 48: Västmanland Defence District (S 1)
Fo 51: Örebro Defence District (I 3)
Fo 52: Värmland Defence District (I 2)
Fo 53: Kopparberg Defence District (I 13)
Fo 61: Västerbotten Defence District (I 20)
Fo 63: Boden Defence District (A 8)
Fo 66: Kiruna Defence District (I 22)
Fo 67: Kalix Defence District (independent)

1997
The organisation in 1997:

P 7/Fo 11: South Scanian Regiment
P 2/Fo 14: North Scanian Dragoon Regiment
I 11/Fo 16: Kronoberg Regiment
I 12/Fo 17: Northern Småland Regiment
Fo 18: Kalmar Regiment
I 14/Fo 21: Hälsinge Regiment
I 5/Fo 22: Jämtland Ranger Regiment
I 21/Fo 23: Västernorrland Regiment
I 16/Fo 31: Halland Regiment
Fo 32: West Coast Naval Command
I 15/Fo 34: Älvsborg Regiment
P 4/Fo 35: Skaraborg Regiment
I 4/Fo 41: Life Grenadier Regiment
P 10/Fo 43: Södermanland Regiment
I 1/Fo 44: Svea Life Guards
S 1/Fo 47: Uppland Regiment
Fo 48: Västmanland Regiment
I 3/Fo 51: Life Regiment Grenadiers
I 2/Fo 52: Värmland Regiment
I 13/Fo 53: Dalarna Regiment
I 20/Fo 61: Västerbotten Regiment
Fo 63: Boden Defence District (Bodens försvarsområde)
I 22/Fo 66: Lapland Ranger Regiment
Fo 67: Norrbotten Border Rangers (Norrbottens gränsjägare)

See also
Military district
Military subdivisions of Sweden
List of Swedish defence districts

References

Notes

Print

Web